Human is the fifth studio album by American singer Brandy. It was released on December 5, 2008 by Epic Records, Knockout Entertainment and Koch Records. The album was Norwood's debut Epic Records release, following her split with Atlantic Records in 2005, and her reunion with longtime collaborator and mentor Rodney "Darkchild" Jerkins, who executively produced and wrote most of the album with his songwriting collective.

Despite being generally well-received by critics, Human debuted at number 15 on the US Billboard 200 with opening week sales of 73,000 copies, becoming Brandy's lowest-charting album since her eponymous debut (1994). As of 2012, Human has sold 214,000 copies in the United States, failing to match the commercial success of predecessors. While leading single "Right Here (Departed)" scored Norwood her biggest chart success since "Full Moon" (2002), the second and final "Long Distance" was not as commercially successful.

Human would become the only album Norwood recorded with Epic Records, after departing both the label and Roc Nation in 2009. In later years Norwood would reflect on the album, in 2012–2013 disliking the album itself and blaming its lackluster performance on a lack of vision from all involved parties, before admitting in 2022 that she was now fond of the album.

Background
Brandy Norwood released her fourth studio album Afrodisiac in June 2004, amidst the well-publicized termination of her short-lived business relationship with record executive and entertainment manager Benny Medina. Norwood ended her contract with his Los Angeles-based Handprint Entertainment after less than a year of representation following controversies surrounding Medina's handling of the lead single "Talk About Our Love", and failed negotiations of a purported co-headlining tour with fellow R&B singer Usher. Despite the negative publicity, Afrodisiac emerged as Norwood's most critically acclaimed album by then, but became a moderate seller on most music markets. The album debuted at number three on the Billboard 200 albums chart but while it went on to sell more than 416,000 copies in the United States, it generally failed to chart or sell noticeably elsewhere. Kanye West-produced "Talk About Our Love" reached number six on the UK Singles Chart but later singles such as "Afrodisiac" and "Who Is She 2 U" failed to score successfully on the popular music charts and promotion for the album soon ended.

At the end of 2004, after eleven years with the company, Norwood asked for and received an unconditional release from her original label Atlantic Records. 
By the time her contract expired, several of her longtime patrons such as music producer Darryl Williams and industry executive Sylvia Rhone had left the company and Norwood felt mismanaged by her new team of which she found was "looking more towards the hip-hop artists" on the label and "didn't know what to do with [her]." Completing her contract with Atlantic Records, a compilation album compiling her first four studio albums with the company, entitled The Best of Brandy, was released in March 2005. Thereupon, Norwood reportedly started shopping for a new record deal under Knockout Entertainment, her brother's Ray J's vanity label, which would co-venture her subsequent releases, including her fifth album, which she started recording independently.

Recording and production
Norwood began recording the album in 2005. Breaking away from her usual formula which saw her setting up projects with former main producers such as Keith Crouch, Rodney "Darkchild" Jerkins and Timbaland, she entered the studio with several songwriters and producers to record new music, including Louis Winding and Frederik Tao from Danish production team Maximum Risk. The duo produced several songs for Norwood, including both "Honey" and "Sweet Nothings", all of which were penned by frequent collaborator Kenisha Pratt. Over the following months, Norwood continued recording contract-free with a vast of producers such as Rockwilder and production duo Tim & Bob who finished several demos with her. Her new management also arranged further recording sessions with fellow client Bryan Michael Cox and his production partners Adonis Shropshire and WyldCard at the Track Record Studios in North Hollywood. Supposed to produce her whole album at the time, they worked on a number of ballads and midtempo songs reminiscent of their other productions, including a song called "Cry". In June 2006, Cox announced that he would serve as the album's executive producer, but direction changes resulting from additional sessions left his songs unused.

In December 2006, Norwood was involved in a fatal automobile accident on Los Angeles' San Diego (405) Freeway. The accident claimed the life of the 38-year-old driver of a Toyota that was struck by Norwood's Range Rover. Norwood was neither arrested nor charged with vehicular manslaughter due to insufficient evidence. Nevertheless, multiple lawsuits were filed against her, all of which were ultimately settled out of court by her civil attorney. Posing an extraordinary hardship for Norwood and her family, she stepped down from her role as a judge on the second season of the amateur talent contest America's Got Talent and went into hiatus. Expanding on dealing with the aftermath of the tragedy, Norwood explained, "I just wanted people to know that this wasn't news. It's not something that should be talked about like it's gossip. You don't like me? Fine. But don't use this situation to try to hurt me, because the guilt of being involved is enough. It's something that I'll never truly, truly get over." While the accident put a halt on the album's production, Norwood soon resumed recording which she found to be therapeutic: "I had to face it and find the strength to move forward. Connecting back with music has definitely helped me through everything. Once I got back in the studio, the butterflies went away."

With most of the album being revamped, other musicians joined the project, including Midi Mafia, RedOne, Toby Gad, Frank Ocean, and Brian Kennedy, the latter of which was consulted to replace Cox as the album's executive producer. Together, they crafted a bunch of new songs, including "Freedom", "One Thing" and "Today" which Norwood later described as sounding "more true to the sound" that she had initially envisioned for the album. However, in early 2008, her A&R manager, Brandon Creed, presented Norwood several demo tracks that were produced by Rodney Jerkins, including "Right Here (Departed)". Her former main producer on previous albums such as Never Say Never (1998) and Full Moon (2002), Jerkins hadn't worked with Norwood since 2002, due to conflicting schedules and a disagreement on her decision to work with Timbaland on Afrodisiac in 2003. Again, the album was reconstructed, with Jerkins taking over executive duties. On her decision to collaborate with Jerkins, Norwood commented: "With Rodney being the person who produced [the first single], I, of course, wanted to go from there because of our history and all the music we have made in the past. It felt like the right thing to do [...] I wanted to see where that chemistry would take us creatively this time round." With Jerkins on board, providing the bulk of Human, the sound of the album shifted drastically, with Norwood and her team abandoning most R&B records in favor of his international pop sounds.

Norwood signed a new record deal with Epic Records in April 2008 and intended to finish the album by September of the same year. Additionally, Norwood worked with producers Timbaland (and his protegés J-Roc and James Fauntleroy), Rico Love, Blac Elvis, Rob Knox, The Clutch, and songwriters Chasity Nwagbara, Kara DioGuardi, and Greg Curtis on Human, although their songs remain yet unreleased on any format. Further studio collaborations with Kerry "Krucial" Brothers, Missy Elliott, Yung Berg, and Tonex, by contrast, failed to materialize due to scheduling conflicts.

Music and lyrics
Introduced by the words of Brandy's description of a human being on "Human Intro", the album opens with Jerkins-crafted "The Definition", one of the few uptempo recordings on the album. Written by Atlanta-based songwriter Crystal Johnson, the song depicts Brandy rhapsodizing about love. It received generally mixed reviews, with The Boston Globe emphasizing it the most essential track on Human. "Warm It Up (With Love)", another Darkchild production, was created around a piano sample and released to strong positive reactions. Highlighted by AllMusic and Slant Magazine, Newsday writer Glenn Gamboa noted it as "guiding principle" on the album. Lead single "Right Here (Departed)" was not recorded until late into the production of Human and the first song Brandy recorded with Jerkins following their musical reunification in early June 2008. Written by The Writing Camp and recorded with therapeutical background, the track chronicles a woman's talks about mutual support with loved ones. Fifth track "Piano Man" was recorded as an ode to the kind of creative relationship cultivated by a vocalist and their producer or DJ.

"Long Distance", a ballad about the difficulties of a long-distance relationship, was released to positive reactions by critics, with The New York Times calling it an "hymnlike single that distantly echoes Janet Jackson's "Again." Eighth track "Camouflage", one out of two songs on the album that were written by songwriter Claude Kelly, garnered strong reviews in general, with Newsday declaring it a "worthy cousin to Beyoncé's 'Irreplaceable' that [is] more about esteem-raising and self-improvement than a search for a sassy put-down." "Torn Down", a joint production by Midi Mafia and Dapo Torimiro, was one of the few prominent Human features on the set list of Brandy's Human World Tour (2009). Incorporating elements of country music, critics noted it a "resolute, crisp mix of static synths, acoustic guitar, and hand claps." Brandy wrote the album's title track with help from producer Toby Gad and Canadian singer Esthero. A "silky R&B anthem" as described by Newsday, the ballad deals with forgiveness. "Shattered Heart" is a downbeat track, that incorporates elements of Middle Eastern music and changes its tempo after three minutes. It has been described as the only "Timbo-esque" record on Human.

The album's twelfth track, a piano-driven ballad entitled "True", was contributed by RedOne and Claude Kelly and initially written for Michael Jackson. The song was rearranged and partially rewritten to fit Norwood's persona. It was released to positive reviews by critics, who noted it one of the stronger tracks on Human. "A Capella (Something's Missing)", produced by Soundz, is a near-a cappella song on which Brandy provides "a polyphonic cyberchorus" with multiple tracks of her own voice. Humming the bassline and providing the rhythm, the instrumentation on the track consists of a sole electric guitar. Hand-clap-laden uptempo recording "1st & Love", the album's fourteenth track, depicts a woman's euphoria with a new-found love at first sight and was discussed as the third single at times. Final track "Fall", another piano ballad, was co-written by labelmate Natasha Bedingfield. As reported, Norwood and Bedingfield were forced to move their first joint recording session from Atlanta to Los Angeles as singer Chris Brown and his entourage crashed into the studio, where they "blasted Brown's songs and horsed around".

Title
Norwood revealed the title of the album as well as the name of several new songs in a press statement on August 15, 2008. Named after its title track, which she co-wrote, Norwood stated, "it's called Human because that's what I am and at the end of the day we all are only human. The album speaks for itself." Further elaborating on the title, the statement uttered that the title was "a real life mirror of Brandy as a woman, an artist, a musician and a performer, communicating what it means to be fully Human: strong yet vulnerable, candid and triumphant, in love with life and in touch with the things of the spirit."

Release and promotion
Although Epic Records announced the release of Human for November 11, 2008, a call from Timbaland, who requested Norwood to record additional music with him and protegés J-Roc and James Fauntleroy, caused another month-long delay of the album. His tracks, however, did not make the final cut on the album track listing as he was unable to contribute trademark backing vocals to his songs. Human was first released in France on December 5, 2008. On December 8, it was released in Australia and the United Kingdom, and in North America the following day, by Epic Records, Knockout Entertainment and Koch Records. The deluxe edition was released simultaneously with the standard edition through digital media stores; in addition to the original track listing, it features five songs, including bonus tracks "Gonna Find My Love" and "Locket (Locked In Love)", and remixes of "Right Here (Departed)" and "Long Distance", the latter of which feature contribution by English DJ Moto Blanco and Jamaican American rapper Sean Kingston. Elsewhere, Human was not released until February 2009. In Japan, Sony Music Japan released a limited edition with a 3-video bonus DVD, including music videos and the making of "Right Here (Departed)".

During a promotional tour in support of the album, Norwood stopped by BET's 106 & Park to perform a five-piece mini-concert that featured the first two singles from the album in addition to "What About Us?", "Full Moon" (both 2002) and "Almost Doesn't Count" (1999). In addition, she launched the worldwide release of the album on Good Morning America with an interview and a performance of "Right Here (Departed)". Throughout December, Norwood appeared on other television shows such as The Tyra Banks Show and CW11's Morning Show. In support of the album, Brandy was also featured on the November 2008 cover of American weekly magazine Jet. Promotion on the album ended soon after its release and Norwood subsequently started work on a second album with Epic Records. Amongst those to record with her were songwriting and production partners Tricky Stewart, The-Dream, Stargate, Ne-Yo, and Human collaborator Brian Kennedy.

After a small promotional tour in the fall of 2008, which saw her perform at music festivals, Norwood embarked on a concert tour in February 2009 to further promote Human, titled Human World Tour. As well as singing songs from Human, Norwood also performed songs from her previous albums Brandy, Never Say Never, Full Moon and Afrodisiac, a set that was largely inspired by her BET concert special Brandy: Just Human, which aired on December 5, 2008. The tour began in Athens, Ohio on February 7, 2009, and concluded in Okmulgee, Oklahoma on June 19, 2009; some concerts were part of annual events such as the Milwaukee Pridefest and the San Jose Pride. Selected venues featured supporting appearances by Colby O'Donis, Ray J, Bell X1, and Samsaya.

Singles
"Right Here (Departed)" premiered on Norwood's official webpage on August 13, 2008 and was released as the album's lead single on September 9, 2008. While the song charted moderately in the United States, where it reached number 34 on the Billboard Hot 100, the track became Norwood's highest-charting single in years elsewhere, reaching the top ten of the French Singles Chart, and the top 20 on the Japan Hot 100. It also peaked at number 22 on the Hot R&B/Hip-Hop Songs and became Norwood's first Hot Dance Club Play number-one on the Billboard charts. An accompanying music video for "Right Here (Departed)" was directed by Little X and filmed in Los Angeles in August 2008. It reached number one on BET's 106 & Park countdown and was voted 69th on BET: Notarized top 100 videos of 2008.

Second single "Long Distance" was released on November 11, 2008. The song became the album's second consecutive Hot Dance Club Play number-one and peaked at number 38 on the Billboard Hot R&B/Hip-Hop Songs chart but failed to enter the Hot 100. Upon its television debut, the Chris Robinson-directed music video for "Long Distance" came in at number nine on the 106 & Park countdown on December 22, 2008, and peaked at the top position in January 2009.

Upon the album's release, "The Definition" and "True" reached numbers 16 and 18 on the Billboard Bubbling Under R&B/Hip-Hop Singles chart, respectively, based solely on digital downloads. While Norwood considered both "Piano Man" and "1st & Love" as potential third single candidates, plans for another single from Human failed to materialize.

Critical reception

While Human became Norwood's first effort not to be nominated for a Grammy Award in any category, it received generally favorable reviews from music critics, averaging a 67 out of a 100 among averaged reviews on Metacritic. Sarah Rodman of The Boston Globe complimented the album as appropriately rich and varied: "It's better than good enough. It's a light, breezy listen that shows off Brandy's resilience, humility, joy, and vibrancy." She especially highlighted Jerkins' input on the album: "Jerkins manages to bring out the expressive best in her pleasantly raspy vocalizing." The Guardian writer Alex Macpherson noted Human "a thoughtful, intimate work on which Norwood sings movingly about fragility and fear," giving it four and a half stars out of five, while Andy Kellman of AllMusic called the album Norwood's "most platitudinal" and "least enjoyable release in her catalog," adding: "Brandy is clearly in a comfort zone that enables her to open up more than ever [...] Human is nothing if not a serious album. But it could very well be her most useful one." He gave the album three and half stars out of five. Billboard magazine said that "while Human is missing the sassy Brandy we know and love from such tracks like 'I Wanna Be Down' and 'Talk About Our Love,' we can still appreciate the much-needed solace of setting personal turmoil to memorable music."

Jon Dolan, writing for Blender, gave the album three out of five stars and commended Norwood's decision to re-team with Jerkins: "Now she's gone back to girlie hip-hop Eden; four songs were written by Jerkins, author of her best late-'90s hits. Fluttery jams about long distance longing and time-suspending slow dances are balanced by grown-up moments of deeply felt, if slightly weird, balladic fortitude." Jon Pareles from The New York Times felt that the sentiments of the songs, whether self-affirming or heartbroken, were back to generic ones: "Song titles like 'Torn Down' and 'Shattered Heart' show how much Brandy is trying to get serious, taking on an adult world where happily ever after is elusive. But she still comes across as a fledgling, a personality still being formed, eagerly tagging along after her role models." In his review for Entertainment Weekly, Henry Goldblatt noted "the huskiness that defined Brandy's prior work has been replaced by wispier and higher tones. The result is pleasant but far less ambitious than her last CD, 2004's Afrodisiac." Mikael Wood's review for Los Angeles Times was less emphatic. He gave the album one and a half stars out of four, and said: "Unfortunately, it's also hard to make it through the thing. Brandy's strong suit has never been her thoughtfulness; appropriately for someone with her Hollywood history, she's long been one of R&B's emptiest vessels, a gorgeous voice used by a series of gifted producers to communicate their own unique ideas."

Commercial performance
In the United States, Human debuted and peaked at number 15 on the Billboard 200 in the week of December 17, 2008, with first-week sales of 73,000 copies. This marked Norwood's lowest opening sales for an album by then and was a considerable drop from her previous effort Afrodisiac, which had opened to 131,700 units in 2004. Human also became her lowest-peaking studio album on the Billboard 200 since her self-titled debut album, which had peaked at number 20 in 1994. The album also reached number six on the US Digital Albums and became Norwood's fifth consecutive top-five album on the Top R&B/Hip-Hop Albums chart, peaking at number five. Billboard eventually ranked it 40th on its Top R&B/Hip-Hop Albums 2009 year-end chart. Elsewhere, Human widely underperformed upon its release. While lead single "Right Here (Departed)" became Norwood's highest-charting single in years throughout Europe, the album failed to enter most international album charts,<ountdown format although it reached the top 50 on the Wallonian Albums Chart and top 200 on the French Albums Chart. In 2012, Billboard reported that Human had sold 214,000 copies in the United States by then.

Expressing her dissatisfaction with Humans commercial performance, Norwood told British music magazine Blues & Soul in April 2009 that she was "a little disappointed about that" but also felt "pleased that Sony" had greenlit the production of a second album with Epic Records which she expected to feature contribution from StarGate, Ne-Yo, Tricky Stewart, The-Dream, and Brian Kennedy. She further commented: "In hindsight I do feel the last album was a little political. So a lotta changes have been made since Human – and hopefully they're changes for the better! Because, having got all the deep stuff off my chest, I'm now able to really tap into the fun part of music again [...] it's exactly the type of album that I need to be makiing right now!" While Norwood co-wrote and recorded several songs with her team, a planned second album with Epic never came to fruition with some of the material later given to other Sony artists such as Jennifer Lopez and Rihanna after Norwood had parted ways with Epic.

Legacy
In mid-2009, Epic ended their contract with Norwood following the appointment of Amanda Ghost as the label's new president, making Human her only album with the company. A Los Angeles Times article later revealed Norwood's discontent with the success of the project when asked about the commercial failure of Human the following year: "It was lacking my belief in it. It lacked my vision. Pretty much bottom line, if you don't believe in something it's not going to go," she said. "So do I believe that Human was as creative as Never Say Never and Full Moon? No, I do not. You definitely want to put something out that's like that. I felt at the same time I could have had much better songs and a much better set-up." A statement she made during a 2010 interview with Out magazine turned out more harsh: "To hell with that album! [...] Where I felt creatively it could've gone and the space I was in creatively, I needed everybody around me to be in that same space. It would've been a different album, but with the same inspiration and same blessing for other people. It would've been hotter music and a hotter look."

Blaming herself for the album's commercial results, Norwood dismissed the album as "too pop." With her team wanting to produce a crossover album, Norwood had felt pressured to come up with different songs. Commenting on this decision, she later elaborated: "I was listening to the voice of my team more so than what was going on inside of me. With Human, I felt like I wanted to do more R&B music and that's not what we decided to do on that album." The debut season of her 2010 VH1 reality series Brandy and Ray J: A Family Business further revealed that the album's underperformance resulted in another argument between her and executive producer Rodney Jerkins, whose commitment to the project Norwood felt not as "creative and forthcoming" as on previous albums and that he purposefully did not put his best work in the album. Jerkins had distanced himself from the project following its official release, declaring his dissatisfaction with the involvement of other producers on the album. In January 2022, Norwood responded to a fan on Twitter who did not like that Norwood was not fond of Human, by saying "I am now".

Track listing

Notes
 denotes vocal producer
 denotes main and vocal producer
 denotes additional producter

Personnel
Credits adapted from the liner notes of Human.

Mattias Bylund — live strings (track 12), string arrangement
Tania Maxwell Clements — backing vocals
LaShawn Daniels – vocal producer (tracks 2, 4, 8, 11, 15)
Mike Donaldson – recording engineer (tracks 2–5, 8, 11)
Chase N. Cashe – producer (track 14)
Fusako Chubachi – art direction
Brandon Creed – executive producer
James Fauntleroy – vocal producer (tracks 7, 9)
Paul Foley – recording engineer (tracks 2–5, 8, 11)
Jens Gad — drums (track 10)
Toby Gad — guitar, bass guitar, arranger, programming, producer, vocal producer, vocal engineer (track 10)
Brian Gardner – mastering
Daniel Groover — guitar (track 14)
Andy Gwynn – recording engineer (track 14)
Marvin "Tony" Hemmings — keyboards, programming, producer, composer, instrument programming (tracks 2–5)
Hit-Boy – producer (track 14)
Rodney Jerkins — backing vocals, musician (tracks 2–5, 11), producer, mixing (tracks 2–5, 7–8, 11), string section arranger, string section conductor (track 4), executive producer
Kee — backing vocals (track 12)
Claude Kelly – vocal arrangement
Brian Kennedy – producer (track 15)
Rich King – vocal producer, arranger
Alice Lord — viola
Bruno Mars – producer, vocal producer (track 7)
Adam Messinger — piano (track 12), keyboards
John D. Norten – engineer (tracks 13, 15)
Brandy Norwood — lead vocals (all tracks), backing vocals (tracks 10, 12), executive producer, vocal producer (tracks 2–5, 7–15), vocal arranger (tracks 2–5, 7, 9–15), arranger (track 8)
Greg Ogan – engineer (tracks 2, 7, 15), vocal engineer (track 10)
Jordan Omley – vocal producer (tracks 3, 5)
Chris Plata – producer
RedOne — backing vocals, piano, other instruments, instrument programming, producer, live strings arranger, vocal arranger, vocal editing, engineer (track 12)
Jim Sitterly — violin (track 10)
Soundz – producer (track 13)
Dapo Torimiro — producer (track 9), guitar, keyboards, programming
Bruce Waynne – music producer (track 9)

Charts

Weekly charts

Year-end charts

Release history

See also
 Album era

References

External links
 Official website

2008 albums
Epic Records albums
Knockout Entertainment albums
Brandy Norwood albums
Albums produced by Brian Kennedy (record producer)
Albums produced by Hit-Boy
Albums produced by Jeff Bhasker
Albums produced by Rodney Jerkins
Albums produced by RedOne
Albums produced by Toby Gad
Albums produced by the Smeezingtons

hu:Human (album)